Orellana is an inland province of Ecuador. The capital is Puerto Francisco de Orellana (also known as Coca). It was created on July 30, 1998, from part of Napo Province.

The name of the province derives from the explorer Francisco de Orellana who it is told to have sailed from somewhere near the town to the Atlantic Ocean.  He did this trip several times looking for the gold city of El Dorado and in search of a rumored Nutmeg forest which at the time was a very expensive spice.  During his voyages he met a ferocious tribe of Indians who attacked his ships and many among them were women.  This led to the naming of the river as the Amazon river.
The province is divided in four cantons.

Cantons 
The province is divided into four cantons. The following table lists each with its population at the 2001 census, its area in square kilometres (km²), and the name of the canton seat or capital.

Demographics
Ethnic groups as of the Ecuadorian census of 2010:
Mestizo  57.5%
Indigenous  31.8%
Afro-Ecuadorian  4.9%
White  4.4%
Montubio  1.2%
Other  0.2%

Economy
Jungle composes most of the province's territory, forcing it to rely primarily on exports of crude oil, and timber. Its second most important source of income is tourism, offering jungle exploration, indigenous encounters, and rivers. Mining is the third reliable source of income.

Places of interest 
 Cuyabeno Wildlife Reserve

See also 
 Cantons of Ecuador

References 

 
Provinces of Ecuador